Coleophora rebeli is a moth of the family Coleophoridae. It is found in Turkestan and Uzbekistan.

References

rebeli
Moths of Asia
Moths described in 1930